Old Dam is a hamlet in Derbyshire, England.

References 

Hamlets in Derbyshire
High Peak, Derbyshire
Towns and villages of the Peak District